Trifan is a surname. Notable people with the surname include:

Andrei Trifan (born 1996), Moldovan footballer 
Marioara Trifan (born 1950), American pianist and conductor

See also
 Trifa

Romanian-language surnames